Vilavade railway station is a station on Konkan Railway. The previous station on the line is Adavali railway station and the succeeding station is Rajapur Road railway station.

References

Railway stations along Konkan Railway line
Railway stations in Ratnagiri district
Ratnagiri railway division